BC Radviliškis is a professional Radviliškis, Lithuania basketball club klubas, currently playing in National Basketball League. In 2009 BC Radviliškis became RKL champions and got permission to participate in NKL.

During fourth transition game RKL champion BC Radviliškis with result 102:58 crushed NKL outsider Alytus Alytaus-Alramstos basketball team and won serie with result 3:1, because of that BC Radviliškis was automatically transferred to second-tier Lithuania basketball league NKL.

Club achievements 
 2003-2004 season: LKBL 1st
 2004-2005 season: LKBL 8th
 2005-2006 season: RKL ?th
 2006-2007 season: RKL ?th
 2007-2008 season: RKL 4th
 2008-2009 season: RKL 1st
 2009-2010 season: NKL 11th

Team roster

2009-2010 season 

 Head Coach:  Algis Pipiras

External links 
 BC Radviliškis NKLsmscredit.lt
 BC Radviliškis fans
 Radviliškis sport center

 
Radviliskis
Sport in Radviliškis
National Basketball League (Lithuania) teams